Michael Campus (March 28, 1935 – May 15, 2015) was an American director, screenwriter and producer. He is best known for directing the 1973 film The Mack. He died on May 15, 2015, at his home in Encino, California of melanoma.

Filmography
Z.P.G. (1972)
The Mack (1973)
The Education of Sonny Carson (1974)
The Passover Plot (1976)
Christmas Cottage (2008)

References

External links

 Birch Grove Films

1935 births
2015 deaths
American film directors
American male screenwriters
Deaths from melanoma